Triticum urartu, also known as red wild einkorn wheat, and a form of einkorn wheat, is a grass species related to wheat, and native to western Asia. It is a diploid species whose genome is the A genome of the allopolyploid hexaploid bread wheat Triticum aestivum, which has genomes AABBDD.

References

Pooideae
Wheat
Cytogenetics